Orthotylus divisus is a species of bug from a family of Miridae that can be found in Greece, Spain, and on islands such as Sardinia, Sicily, and Canary Islands.

References

Insects described in 1961
Hemiptera of Europe
divisus